The Oscar Theatre Company is a theater company operating in Brisbane, Australia. It is interested in the provision of further work opportunities for Queensland professional and emerging artists. The company seeks to introduce and engage youth with contemporary theatre, by offering live performance as an alternative in the Brisbane social scene.  Oscar receives no funding and relies heavily on corporate sponsorship and patron support.

History
Oscar Theatre Company was founded by local performer Emily Gilhome in 2004 with a view to support and produce new works and productions for young Queensland theatre artists.

Productions

Artistic directors
The current Artistic and Managing Director is Emily Gilhome.

References

External links
 Oscar Theatre Company Website

Theatre in Brisbane
Theatre companies in Australia
Entertainment companies established in 2004
Companies based in Brisbane
2004 establishments in Australia